The Jiann-Ping Hsu College of Public Health is one of the eight colleges of Georgia Southern University, located in Statesboro, Georgia, in the United States.

History

On January 14, 2004 the Board of Regents established the first School of Public Health in the University System of Georgia and named it the Jiann-Ping Hsu School of Public Health. Establishment of the School was made possible by a private donation from Dr. Karl E. Peace, in memory and honor of his wife, Dr. Jiann-Ping Hsu.

In order to place the School in the best possible position for accreditation by the Council on Education for Public Health (CEPH), it was re-designated the Jiann-Ping Hsu College of Public Health, effective January 1, 2006. The mission of the Jiann-Ping Hsu College of Public Health (JPHCOPH) is to improve health, eliminate health disparities and health inequities of rural communities and underserved populations globally through excellence in teaching, public health workforce development, research, scholarship, professional service and community engagement.

From January 2006-June 2011, the founding dean of the Jiann-Ping Hsu College of Public Health and Professor of Community Health was Dr. Charles J. Hardy. Dean Hardy facilitated the development of the college into a sustainable academic unit within Georgia Southern University. During his tenure as Dean, and with the leadership of Dr. Carolyn Woodhouse, Associate Dean, the JPHCOPH administration, staff and faculty developed the CEPH accreditation self-study and hosted the accreditation team site visit. In June 2011, JPHCOPH received full accreditation by the Council on Education for Public Health (CEPH).

On January 11, 2014 at the Henderson Library, the college celebrated its 10th Anniversary.

In a press release on April 17, 2020, the university announced the appointment of Dr. Stuart Tedders as dean of the college. He is a professor of epidemiology from Perry, Georgia who started working at GS in 2000. A founding member of the Jiann-Ping Hsu College of Public Health, he later became an associate dean for academic affairs in 2012 before serving as interim dean of the college. “I am delighted to be selected as the next dean of the Jiann-Ping Hsu College of Public Health,” Tedders said in the press release. “Having spent much of my career at Georgia Southern University, I am proud to continue serving an institution with such strong traditions of excellence and a vision to serve rural and underserved communities.”

Curriculum

The faculty of the college is devoted to excellence in teaching, research, and public health practice and service. Students gain valuable insight, experience, and skills that contribute to their success in the public health workforce.

Bachelor of Science in Public Health Degree - emphasis areas:

 Emphasis in Environmental Health
 Emphasis in Epidemiology
 Emphasis in Global Health (online)
 Emphasis in Health Education and Promotion

Master of Public Health Degree - concentrations:

 Applied Public Health (online)
 Biostatistics
 Community Health
 Environmental Health Sciences
 Epidemiology
 Health Informatics (online)
 Health Policy and Management

Doctor of Public Health Degree - concentrations:

 Biostatistics
 Community Health Behavior and Education
 Epidemiology
 Health Services Policy and Management
 Public Health Leadership (online)

Certificates

 Certificate in Public Health (online)

Centers

The Jiann-Ping Hsu College of Public Health houses three centers:

 The Karl E. Peace Center for Biostatistics functions as a technical operation support center to Georgia Southern University and to the external community engaged in health-related research.
 The Center for Public Health Practice and Research is committed to engaging in efforts to improve the health status of rural and underserved communities through the effective application of health promotion and primary prevention.
 The Center for Addiction Recovery is a non-profit entity dedicated to the study of addiction and the process of long-term recovery through research, educational programs and community-based outreach and services.

References

External links
 Jiann-Ping Hsu College of Public Health

 
Schools of public health in the United States
2006 establishments in Georgia (U.S. state)
Educational institutions established in 2006